The Philippine Atheism, Agnosticism, and Secularism Inc. (PATAS) is a nonprofit organization for the public understanding of atheism and agnosticism in the Philippines. It serves to educate society, and eliminate myths and misconceptions about atheism and agnosticism. It speaks against discrimination of the non-religious, and for equal opportunities as Filipino citizens. PATAS encourages harmonious information exchange among its atheist and agnostic members, and encourages its members to come out and speak for their lack of religious beliefs. The society was founded in February 2011 by John Paraiso, who served as the first chairperson and president, respectively.

First Atheist and Agnostics Convention

On April 21, 2012 PATAS organized the First Atheists and Agnostics Convention in the Philippines. It was a one-day learning event and social gathering of Filipino nonbelievers.

The convention, with its theme: "Filipino non-belief—are you ready for this?", also served as a venue for the public exposure for socially-involved and organized community of Filipino nonbelievers.

See also
 Irreligion in the Philippines
 Religion in the Philippines

References

Atheist organizations
Skeptic organizations in the Philippines